Alberto E. A. Zanetti Spaggiari (born 2 May 1956) is an Argentine sailor. He competed at the 1988 Summer Olympics and the 1992 Summer Olympics.

Notes

References

External links
 
 

1956 births
Living people
Argentine male sailors (sport)
Olympic sailors of Argentina
Sailors at the 1988 Summer Olympics – Star
Sailors at the 1992 Summer Olympics – Star
Place of birth missing (living people)